Social dominance may refer to:

Social dominance orientation
Social dominance theory
Expressions of dominance
Power (social and political)

See also
Dominance (disambiguation)